, also known as Doraemon and the Winged Warriors, is a 2001 Japanese animated science fiction adventure film which premiered in Taiwan on 8 March 2001, based on the 21st volume of the same name of the Doraemon Long Stories series. It's the 22nd Doraemon film. This is the first new millennium and new century-era Doraemon movie.

Plot 
After watching a televised showing about supposedly humanoid birds spotted in Africa, Nobita dreams of being able to fly with wings. He builds wooden wings after Doraemon refuses to help him, though he repeatedly fails to fly using them. While helping Shizuka to reclaim her pet canary, they witness a portal opens in the sky and a humanoid bird riding an airplane coming out. He introduces himself as Gusuke, a humanoid bird who lives in "Birdopia". Doraemon, Nobita, and Shizuka help Gusuke fix his airplane, where Nobita becomes fast friends with him. As Gusuke departs to his home, Gian and Suneo catch him and grab his plane. The other three follow them through the portal.

Arriving at Birdopia, Gian and Suneo are captured by crow soldiers and brought to the vulture Commander Seagrid, who plans execution for them. Meanwhile, Doraemon, Nobita, and Shizuka find Gusuke near the owl Professor Hou's house after fleeing from the same crow soldiers with the help of an ostrich taxi service. Hou explains that Birdopia is a world existed far away from human world and is connected only during bird migration, which are guarded by Bird Migration Patrolling Troops. Seagrid was once a member of the troops, but he was shot by humans and retired shortly, seeking vengeance at them. After Hou advises them to take cover as not many liked humans in Birdopia, Doraemon brings "Bird Hats" which can sprout wings by wearing them, with him as a pigeon, Nobita a duck, and Shizuka a swan. The three and Gusuke manage to stage a rescue of Gian and Suneo shortly thereafter, and Doraemon gives them Bird Hats of an albatross and a woodpecker respectively. Gusuke informs Nobita and his friends that there will be an annual competition, "Rally Icarus", which is used to recruit members of the Patrolling Troops, and that they should join it. During a dinner with Gusuke's parents and his friend, Milk, Gusuke confesses that he is actually adopted and that he is unable to fly naturally due to the trauma of falling he got before being founded. Meanwhile, Hou translates an ancient Birdopia tablet which contains information about Phoenicia, an ancient dragon-like being who can bring destruction to the world. The captain of the crow soldiers reports to Seagrid after overhearing it, after which Seagrid kidnaps Hou for the location of Phoenicia so he will be able to use it to destroy humanity.

During Rally Icarus which takes place at a giant tree called the Perched Tree, Gusuke manages to win but gets disqualified when Seagrid's falcon lieutenant Babylon, by Seagrid's orders, explains that he did not fly naturally. The group later realize that Hou is missing and after Doraemon learns about Phoenicia by reading the tablet using Translator Jelly, go to search for Icarus, a legendary eagle who was imprisoned in the Birdopia prison after being falsely accused of letting Seagrid shot. They manage to convince him to stop Seagrid from awakening Phoenicia, who is buried at a mountain. Along the way, they find a projector which projects a hologram of Mamoru Torino, a 23rd-century Ornithologist who is obsessed in creating a safe haven for birds, which eventually led to the creation of Birdopia, an alternate timeline of the human world. However, the group is too late to stop Seagrid as he successfully awakens Phoenicia. Doraemon attempts to de-evolve Phoenicia into an amoeba using his Transgression Beam, but he gets into a struggle with Babylon, which causes the beam to instead evolve the creature into a bigger, stronger version. The creature does not follow Seagrid's bidding and goes on a rampage in Birdopia. During the battle, Gusuke awakes his ability to fly and manages to lure Phoenicia to the top of the Perched Tree, while Doraemon and Nobita travel to the top of the tree where Mamoru's time machine is located, intending to harm Phoenicia. While it does not work, they instead transport both the machine and Phoenicia back to billions of years in the past, before the Earth is even created (Pre-Hadean Era).

Celebrating the victory over Phoenicia, Gusuke is revealed to be Icarus's son and he is given the position of Captain of the Bird Migration Patrolling Troops. Nobita and his friends bid farewell to Gusuke before returning to their home world.

Cast

Release
The film was released in Taiwan on 8 March 2001. It was released in India on 8 September 2019 with the title 'Doraemon The Movie Nobita Aur Birdopia Ka Sultan'.

References

External links 
 Doraemon The Movie 25th page 
 

2001 films
2001 anime films
Nobita and the Winged Braves
Animated films about birds
Films directed by Tsutomu Shibayama
2000s monster movies
Robot films
Animated films about robots
Animated films about cats
Films set in Germany
2000s children's animated films